Mohamed Diamé (born 14 June 1987), also known as Momo Diamé, is a professional footballer who plays as a midfielder.

Though born in France, Diamé represented Senegal at international level and made 31 appearances before retiring from national duty in 2017.

Club career

Early career
Diamé was born in the Paris suburb of Créteil and he was selected to attend the Clairefontaine academy between 2000 and 2003. Diamé began his professional career in 2003 with RC Lens, but left four years later after facing health problems. After a full recovery, he signed for lowly Spanish side CD Linares on 30 July 2007, and moved to Rayo Vallecano the following year, helping the Madrid-based team to a mid-table position in the Segunda División, after being promoted in the 2007–08 season. During his time with Rayo it was reported that La Liga clubs Real Madrid and Barcelona were interested in signing the midfielder, as well as Premier League side Arsenal.

Wigan Athletic
On 22 August 2009, Diamé joined Wigan Athletic, signing a three-year contract. The transfer had earlier been temporarily put on hold, after alleged heart problems were found. Diamé made his debut the same day as his transfer, in a 5–0 defeat to Manchester United. He scored his first goal for Wigan against Sunderland on 6 February 2010. At the end of the 2011–12 season, he left Wigan after declining their offer to extend his contract.

West Ham United
On 20 June 2012, Diamé joined West Ham United, signing a three-year contract. Diamé made his debut for West Ham on 18 August 2012 in a 1–0 win against Aston Villa. He scored his first goal for West Ham United in the 3–1 defeat to Arsenal on 6 October 2012. His second goal for the club was scored in the 3–1 victory over Chelsea on 1 December 2012. On 9 December 2012, Diamé was injured in a match against Liverpool; it was initially thought he could be out for up to three months. In January 2013, after a number of clubs were reported to be interested in signing him, Diamé stated that he wished to stay with West Ham. Diamé did not leave the club in the transfer window, and manager Sam Allardyce stated that it was an important decision.

Hull City

On 1 September 2014, Diamé joined Hull City, signing a three-year contract. Two weeks later, he made his debut at the KC Stadium, scoring against his former club West Ham in a 2–2 draw.

On 28 May 2016, Diamé scored in the Championship play-off final in a 1–0 win against Sheffield Wednesday, giving Hull an immediate return to the Premier League after their relegation in the 2014–15 season.

Newcastle United
On 3 August 2016, Diamé joined Newcastle United, signing a three-year contract. Diamé scored his first goals for Newcastle when he scored twice in an EFL Cup win against Preston North End on 25 October 2016.

In October 2017 he had a training ground fight with teammate Jamaal Lascelles. The two players later apologised and offered to take the entire first team squad and staff out for lunch.

He was released by Newcastle upon the expiry of his contract at the end of the 2018–19 season.

Al Ahli SC
On 11 July 2019, Diamé joined Qatari side Al-Ahli on a two-year contract.

Fuenlabrada
On 8 April 2022, Diamé signed a contract with Spanish second level side Fuenlabrada until the end of the season. In January 2023, Diamé had his contract terminated by mutual consent.

International career
On 22 March 2011, Diamé was called up to play for Senegal, for whom he qualifies as his father was born in Dakar. Diamé made his international debut later that month.

In July 2012, Diamé was announced as one of three over-age players in Senegal's squad for the 2012 Olympics. He scored his first international goal for Senegal on 26 March 2016 in a 2–0 win against Niger in a 2017 Africa Cup of Nations qualification match.

He retired from international football in March 2017.

Personal life
Diamé is Muslim.

Career statistics

Club

International

Scores and results list Senegal's goal tally first, score column indicates score after each Diamé goal.

Honours
Hull City
Football League Championship play-offs: 2016

Newcastle United
EFL Championship: 2016–17

References

External links

Mohamed Diamé profile at the official Hull City A.F.C. website

1987 births
Living people
French Muslims
French sportspeople of Senegalese descent
Citizens of Senegal through descent
Sportspeople from Créteil
Footballers from Val-de-Marne
Senegalese footballers
French footballers
Association football midfielders
Senegal international footballers
Olympic footballers of Senegal
Footballers at the 2012 Summer Olympics
2012 Africa Cup of Nations players
2017 Africa Cup of Nations players
RC Lens players
Segunda División players
Segunda División B players
Premier League players
English Football League players
Qatar Stars League players
INF Clairefontaine players
CD Linares players
Rayo Vallecano players
Wigan Athletic F.C. players
West Ham United F.C. players
Hull City A.F.C. players
Newcastle United F.C. players
Al Ahli SC (Doha) players
CF Fuenlabrada footballers
French expatriate footballers
Senegalese expatriate sportspeople in Spain
Expatriate footballers in Spain
Senegalese expatriate sportspeople in England
Expatriate footballers in England
Expatriate footballers in Qatar
Senegalese expatriate sportspeople in Qatar